The Canopus Crags are a cluster of peaks of  extent, located between Vela Bluff and Carina Heights along the south side of Ryder Glacier, in Palmer Land. They were named by the UK Antarctic Place-Names Committee after the star Canopus in the constellation of Carina.

References 

Cliffs of Palmer Land